Literal Tour Grandes Éxitos or simply Literal Tour is the world tour by the dominican artist Juan Luis Guerra to support his 14th studio Literal. The tour kick off on June 21, 2019 in Valencia, Spain and ended in Orlando, Florida on October 27, 2019. The tour visited seven cities in the United States. The tour was planned to continue in 2020, however, it was cancelled due the COVID-19 pandemic.

Overview 
Tommy Calle from Los Angeles Times, gave a positive review to the concert in Los Angeles and wrote "The Dominican singer set up the party at Microsoft with his merengue, salsa and bachata classics before a heterogeneous audience that put aside reggaeton and regional". Also, he stated that the attendance was 7,000. In the same way, Marcos Torres from Houston Press, praised the concert at the city and title his review "Juan Luis Guerra Turns Smart Financial Centre into a Tropical Dance Party". Also, it was his first time ever performing at venue and the city.

In Madrid, it was reported that 15,000 sold out the venue and 12,000 in Bogota. The concert in Miami receive positive by the media was crownded with 13,000 fans.The concert in Panama was reported sold out.

Tour dates

Cancelled Shows

References 

2019 concert tours
Juan Luis Guerra